The office of mayor of Niagara Falls, New York is currently held by Robert Restaino. Prior to the establishment of the mayorship, the highest official in Niagara Falls was known as the "village president" and was held by Peter A. Porter in 1878.

List of mayors

List of village presidents

History

In 1892, upon the establishment of the mayors office, the length of office was a one-year term. 
In 1897, the term limit was changed to a two-year term.
In 1901, the term was changed again to begin on the third Tuesday of April. The mayor, as the chief executive officer, no longer voted or took part in council meetings. A president of the council was elected, along with the alderman from each of the six wards and four aldermen elected at large. The president of the Common Council assumed the tie-breaking vote and the "municipal year" was changed to begin on the third Tuesday of April.
In 1902, the New York State Legislature decided to change the political terms of local officials to coincide with the calendar year. The Niagara Falls Common Council opposed the change, but it passed and interrupted the first term of Mayor Hancock. Hancock's term began on April 15, 1902, but ended on Dec. 31, 1902. Upon his reelection, he began his second term on January 1, 1903.
In 1904, the Town of Niagara Falls and the Village of Niagara Falls were amalgamated to form the "City of Niagara Falls."
From 1916 to 1985, government in Niagara Falls consisted of a council of four members and a mayor. The mayor and council members were elected to four-year terms and they appointed the city manager, who ran the day-to-day operation of city government.

Mayoral elections
The 2015 mayoral election was held on Tuesday November 3, 2015, with the following candidates: Incumbent mayor Paul Dyster (Democrat) and challenger John Accardo (Republican). Dyster won (4,267 to 3,468) his third term as Mayor of Niagara Falls.  With the win, Dyster joined E. Dent Lackey as the only two three-term mayors in Niagara Falls and became the second longest tenured after former Mayor Michael O'Laughlin, the city’s longest-tenured mayor who held four consecutive terms from 1976 to 1991.

References

Mayors of Niagara Falls, New York
Niagara Falls, New York